The women's coxed four competition at the 1976 Summer Olympics took place at Notre Dame Island Olympic Basin, Canada. It was the first time the event was contested for women.

Competition format

The competition consisted of two main rounds (heats and finals) as well as a repechage. The 8 boats were divided into two heats for the first round, with 4 boats in each heat. The winner of each heat advanced directly to the "A" final (1st through 6th place). The remaining 6 boats were placed in the repechage. A single repechage heat was held. The top 4 boats in the repechage went to the "A" final as well. The remaining 2 boats (5th and 6th place in the repechage) competed in the "B" final for 7th and 8th place.

All races were over a 1000 metre course.

Results

Heats

Heat 1

Heat 2

Repechage

Finals

Final B

Final A

Final classification

References

Women's rowing at the 1976 Summer Olympics
Rowing at the 1976 Summer Olympics